is a Japanese stage and film actor, and one of the original Tokyo Sunshine Boys, a theatrical troupe that lasted from 1983 to about 1994. He is currently seen in television dramas and onstage in Japan.

Biography
Aijima Kazuyuki was born November 30, 1961 in Saitama, Japan. He joined Mitani Koki's Tokyo Sunshine Boys theatrical troupe in 1983, which grew in popularity until its movie debut with the parody of Reginald Rose's 12 Angry Men, a comedy called 12 Gentle Japanese released in 1991. Aijima was one of the few Tokyo Sunshine Boys to pass the movie auditions to star in their own film - in fact he stole the lead. Most of them never made it into the film.

Aijima is specially trained in Kendo and can play a number of musical instruments as well.

Filmography

Film
12 Gentle Japanese (1991)
Suite Dreams (2006)
A Ghost of a Chance (2011)
Library Wars: The Last Mission (2015)
Three Nobunagas (2019), Sena Nobuteru
Shrieking in the Rain (2021)
In Her Room (2023)

Television
Furuhata Ninzaburō (1996)
Shomuni (1998–2003)
Kasouken no Onna (1999)
Hero (2001)
Fugo Keiji (2005)
Hana Moyu (2015)
The Hippocratic Oath (2016)
Naotora: The Lady Warlord (2017)
Yell (2020)
Karei-naru Ichizoku (2021)
The 13 Lords of the Shogun (2022), Unkei

Theatre
My Fair Lady - Colonel Hugh Pickering (2018)

References

External links

Japanese male actors
Actors from Saitama Prefecture
Living people
People from Saitama Prefecture
People from Saitama (city)
Rikkyo University alumni
1961 births